The 2011 Bremen state election was held on 22 May 2011 to elect the members of the Bürgerschaft of Bremen, as well as the city councils of Bremen and Bremerhaven. The incumbent government of the Social Democratic Party (SPD) and The Greens was re-elected with an increased majority. The Greens became the second largest party in a state legislature first time in western Germany.

Sixteen and seventeen year olds were able to vote for the first time in this election. A reform to the electoral system came into effect in this election, based on an open list system, with each voter having five votes to distribute freely between parties and candidates.

Parties
The table below lists parties represented in the previous Bürgerschaft of Bremen.

Opinion polling

Election result

|-
! rowspan="2" colspan="2" | Party
! rowspan="2" | Votes
! rowspan="2" | %
! rowspan="2" | +/-
! colspan="2" | Seats
! rowspan="2" | Totalseats
! rowspan="2" | +/-
! rowspan="2" | Seats %
|-
! Bremen
! Bremerhaven
|-
| bgcolor=| 
| align=left | Social Democratic Party (SPD)
| align=right| 505,348
| align=right| 38.6
| align=right| 1.9
| align=right| 30
| align=right| 6
| align=right| 36
| align=right| 4
| align=right| 43.4
|-
| bgcolor=| 
| align=left | Alliance 90/The Greens (Grüne)
| align=right| 293,993
| align=right| 22.5
| align=right| 6.0
| align=right| 17
| align=right| 4
| align=right| 21
| align=right| 7
| align=right| 25.3
|-
| bgcolor=| 
| align=left | Christian Democratic Union (CDU)
| align=right| 266,483
| align=right| 20.4
| align=right| 5.2
| align=right| 16
| align=right| 4
| align=right| 20
| align=right| 3
| align=right| 24.1
|-
| bgcolor=| 
| align=left | The Left (Linke)
| align=right| 73,769
| align=right| 5.6
| align=right| 2.8
| align=right| 5
| align=right| 0
| align=right| 5
| align=right| 2
| align=right| 6.0
|-
| bgcolor=| 
| align=left | Citizens in Rage (BiW)
| align=right| 48,530
| align=right| 3.7
| align=right| 2.9
| align=right| 0
| align=right| 1
| align=right| 1
| align=right| 0
| align=right| 1.2
|-
! colspan=8|
|-
| bgcolor=| 
| align=left | Free Democratic Party (FDP)
| align=right| 31,176
| align=right| 2.4
| align=right| 3.6
| align=right| 0
| align=right| 0
| align=right| 0
| align=right| 5
| align=right| 0
|-
| bgcolor=|
| align=left | Pirate Party Germany (Piraten)
| align=right| 24,935
| align=right| 1.9
| align=right| 1.9
| align=right| 0
| align=right| 0
| align=right| 0
| align=right| ±0
| align=right| 0
|-
| bgcolor=|
| align=left | National Democratic Party (NPD)
| align=right| 20,470
| align=right| 1.6
| align=right| 1.1
| align=right| 0
| align=right| 0
| align=right| 0
| align=right| 1
| align=right| 0
|-
| bgcolor=|
| align=left | Others
| align=right| 44,541
| align=right| 3.4
| align=right| 
| align=right| 0
| align=right| 0
| align=right| 0
| align=right| ±0
| align=right| 0
|-
! align=right colspan=2| Total
! align=right| 1,309,355
! align=right| 100.0
! align=right| 
! align=right| 68
! align=right| 15
! align=right| 83
! align=right| ±0
! align=right| 
|-
! align=right colspan=2| Voter turnout
! align=right| 
! align=right| 55.5
! align=right| 2.1
! align=right| 
! align=right| 
! align=right| 
! align=right| 
! align=right| 
|}

Notes

References

Elections in Bremen (state)
2011 elections in Germany